The Night Has Eyes is a 1939 mystery thriller novel by the British writer Alan Kennington. On the Yorkshire Moors a schoolteacher meets and become attracted to a distinctly odd young man living in isolation from the world.

Film adaptation
In 1942 it was made into a British film of the same title directed by Leslie Arliss and starring James Mason and Joyce Howard.

References

Bibliography
 Goble, Alan. The Complete Index to Literary Sources in Film. Walter de Gruyter, 1999.
 McFarlane, Brian . Four from the forties: Arliss, Crabtree, Knowles and Huntington. Manchester University Press, 2018.

1939 British novels
British mystery novels
British thriller novels
British novels adapted into films
Novels set in England
Jarrold Publishing books
Novels by Alan Kennington